The  is a literary award handed out annually (since 1994) by the Japanese publisher ASCII Media Works (formerly MediaWorks) for their Dengeki Bunko light novel imprint. The contest has discovered many popular and successful light novelists, like Kouhei Kadono and Yashichiro Takahashi. Originally called the Dengeki Game Novel Prize, the name was changed in 2003. The main Dengeki Novel Prize awards consist of the Grand Prize (¥3 million), Gold Prize (¥1 million) and Silver Prize (¥500,000). In addition to the money received, the winning novelists get their work published under Dengeki Bunko with the addition of an artist for the illustrated aspects of the light novels. However, if an entry is awarded the Media Works Bunko Prize, the winning novel will be published under ASCII Media Works' Media Works Bunko imprint, along with the author winning ¥1 million. Often, the name of the novel series is changed from what it was originally titled when it won the prize. There are over 5,000 submissions annually since 2011, and it is considered the largest prize for light novels.

Committee members
Hitoshi Yasuda: Novelist, translator
Mishio Fukazawa: Novelist
Kyōichirō Takahata: Novelist
Tatsuo Satō: The former board chairman of MediaWorks
Kazutomo Suzuki: The managing editor of Dengeki Bunko

Prizes

Prize winners

1994–2007

2008–present

Notes
 The Grand, Gold, and Silver Prizes were originally the only three prizes offered for the first four rounds between 1994 and 1997.
 Honorable mentions were added with the fifth round in 1998 and were originally called the "Special Prize". In the seventh round in 2000, the prize was renamed as "Honorable Mention".
 The Dengeki Bunko Magazine Prize was added with the fifteenth round in 2008.
 The Media Works Bunko Prize was added with the sixteenth round in 2009.

References

External links
The Dengeki Novel Prize's official website 

1994 establishments in Japan
ASCII Media Works
Awards established in 1994
Light novel awards
MediaWorks (publisher)